The montane garter snake (Thamnophis exsul) is a species of snake of the family Colubridae. It is found in Mexico.

References 

Reptiles described in 1969
Taxa named by Douglas A. Rossman
Reptiles of Mexico
Thamnophis